State Route 251 (SR 251) is a primary state highway in the U.S. state of Virginia. Known for most of its length as Collierstown Road, the state highway runs  from SR 672 and SR 770 in Collierstown north to U.S. Route 11 (US 11) and US 11 Business in Lexington.

Route description

SR 251 begins at an intersection with Turnpike Road, which heads east as SR 672 and west as SR 770, at Collierstown in a valley southwest of House Mountain and east of North Mountain in western Rockbridge County. The state highway heads southeast as two-lane undivided Collierstown Road along Colliers Creek, which empties into Buffalo Creek. After following the latter creek, SR 251 has a winding ascent out of the stream valley. The state highway heads east into the independent city of Lexington, where the highway's name changes to Thornhill Road. When Thornhill Road veers northeast toward downtown Lexington, SR 251 continues along Link Road the short remaining distance to its northern terminus at US 11 (Lee Highway) and US 11 Business (Main Street) southwest of downtown Lexington.

History
The road originally went through Alleghany County, starting at what is now Virginia State Route 269 (previously U.S. Route 60) at Longdale Furnace. It used what is now SR 770 Turnpike Road to get to its current western end in Collerstown. This section was removed on or by May 1945, presumably due to the difficult drive around North Mountain. SR 770 to this day is impassable by certain large vehicles.

Major intersections

References

External links

Virginia Highways Project: VA 251

251
State Route 251
State Route 251